Tamworth Regional Council is a local government area in the New England region of New South Wales, Australia. The area under administration is located adjacent to the New England Highway and the Main North railway line. It was established in March 2004 through the amalgamation of the former City of Tamworth with surrounding shires of Barraba, Manilla, Nundle and Parry.

The mayor of Tamworth Regional Council is Cr. Russell Webb, an independent politician.

Towns and villages 
The area includes the city of Tamworth and the towns and villages of Attunga, Barraba, Bendemeer, Dungowan, Duri, Kootingal, Limbri, Manilla, Moonbi, Niangala, Nundle, Ogunbil, Somerton, Upper Manilla and Woolbrook.

Suburbs 
 Calala
 Coledale
 Daruka Estate
 East Tamworth
 Forest Hills
 Hillvue
 Kingswood
 Nemingha
 North Tamworth
 Oxley Vale
 South Tamworth
 Taminda
 Tamworth
 Tamworth Central Business District 
 Westdale
 West Tamworth

Heritage listings
Tamworth Region has a number of heritage-listed sites, including:
 Kootingal, New England Highway: Moonby House
 Manilla, Tamworth-Barraba railway: Manilla railway underbridges
 Tamworth, Fitzroy Street: Tamworth Post Office
 Tamworth, King George V Memorial Avenue (East): King George V Avenue of Memorial English Oaks
 Tamworth, Main Northern railway: Tamworth railway station
 Tamworth, Main Northern railway: Peel River railway bridge
 Tamworth, Marius Street (East): Dominican Roman Catholic Convent
 Tamworth, Peel Street (cnr): Tamworth Peel Barracks

Demographics
Aboriginal and Torres Strait Islander people made up 10.1 per cent of the population, which was greater than three times higher than the national and average of 2.9 per cent. The median age of people in the Tamworth Regional Council was 40 years, which was marginally higher than the national median of 38 years. Children aged 0 – 14 years made up 20.2 per cent of the population and people aged 65 years and over made up 18.8 per cent of the population. Of people in the area aged 15 years and over, 47.6 per cent were married and 13.2 per cent were either divorced or separated.

Population growth in the Tamworth Regional Council between the 2011 census and the 2016 census was 6.0 per cent. When compared with total population growth of Australia for the same period, being 8.8 per cent, population growth in the Tamworth Regional local government area was slightly lower than the national average. The median weekly income for residents within the Tamworth Regional Council was significantly lower than the national average.

In excess of 70% of all residents in the Tamworth Regional Council nominated a religious affiliation with Christianity at the 2016 census, which was significantly higher than the national average of approximately 60 per cent. Meanwhile, as at the census date, compared to the national average, households in the Tamworth Regional local government area had a significantly lower than average proportion (4.6 per cent) where two or more languages are spoken (national average was 26.4 per cent); and a significantly higher proportion (88.7 per cent) where English only was spoken at home (national average was 68.5 per cent).

Council

Current composition and election method
Tamworth Regional Council is composed of nine councillors elected proportionally as a single ward. All councillors are elected for a fixed four-year term of office. The mayor is elected by the councillors at the first meeting of the council. The most recent election was held on 10 September 2016, and the makeup of the council is as follows:

The current Council, elected in 2022, in order of election, is:

References 

 
Local government areas of New South Wales
Tamworth, New South Wales